The 2022 Madrid summit was a meeting of the heads of state and heads of government of NATO member and partner countries held in Madrid, Spain, on 28–30 June 2022. Spain previously hosted a NATO Summit in 1997.

Background 
On 8 October 2021, following a meeting with NATO secretary general Jens Stoltenberg, Spanish prime minister Pedro Sánchez announced the celebration of the ordinary summit in Madrid in 2022, a date otherwise underscoring the 40th anniversary of Spain's NATO membership. NATO disclosed the summit's logo on 29 March 2022. The meeting was scheduled to occur several months after the 2022 Russian invasion of Ukraine.

Summit 

In the wake of the two days of preparation for the summit in mid June 2022, Jens Stoltenberg reported that key areas to be addressed in the summit include "strengthened deterrence and defence; support for Ukraine and other partners at risk; a new NATO Strategic Concept; better burden-sharing and resourcing; and Finland and Sweden's historic applications for membership".

Venue and security 
The summit will be held at Pavilions 9 and 10 of the IFEMA fairgrounds. Over 25,000 police agents were expected to be deployed in the city. The celebration of Madrid's LGBT Pride was postponed one week due to the summit. The Spanish Ministries of Interior and Foreign Affairs allocated around €37 million without public tender for security enhancement of the summit, including the acquisition of 6,000 taser chargers.

2022 Strategic Concept 
NATO's strategic concept, the 10-year blueprint underpinning the alliance's security challenges in the evolving global landscape and outlining the NATO political and military tasks set to address them, was adopted at the summit, thereby replacing the strategic concept adopted at the 2010 Lisbon summit. The 2010 document makes mention of "peace in the Euro-Atlantic area" and "the threat of a conventional attack on NATO territory [being] low", showing the outdated nature of the previous strategic concept. Gitanas Nausėda, the president of Lithuania, wants the next strategic concept to consider Russia a "long-term threat to the entire Euro-Atlantic area." The United States hopes the document will also have forceful language on China.

The strategic blueprint updated Russia's status (hitherto considered a "strategic partner") as the "most significant and direct threat to Allies' security and to peace and stability in the Euro-Atlantic area". Likewise, China was described in the document as a challenge to allies' "interests, security and values".

EU–NATO interactions 

On 29 June, leaders of member states from both the European Union and NATO will attend a dinner hosted by Spanish Prime Minister Pedro Sánchez in Madrid. During the summit, Irish Taoiseach Micheál Martin will meet bileraterally with Norwegian Prime Minister Jonas Gahr Støre, Icelandic Prime Minister Katrín Jakobsdóttir, and Austrian Chancellor Karl Nehammer, the latter of which will also meet with Turkish President Recep Tayyip Erdoğan.

Finnish and Swedish accession 

In the wake of the February 2022 Russian invasion of Ukraine and a subsequent tilt in the public opinion of Finland and Sweden, the prospect of both countries applying for NATO membership before the summit was raised. On 12 May, Sauli Niinistö and Sanna Marin, respectively the president and prime minister of Finland, issued a joint statement that "Finland must apply for NATO membership without delay". On 16 May, Magdalena Andersson, prime minister of Sweden, announced that Sweden will apply for membership. Both countries submitted their NATO applications on 18 May, yet there was the looming prospect of a Turkish block to accession talks, reportedly over concerns related to Finnish and Swedish relations with the YPG, which Turkey considers a Syrian branch of the PKK. 

On 28 June, the first day of the summit, the Turkish delegation dropped their opposition to Finland and Sweden's NATO membership applications and signed a tripartite memorandum addressing Turkey's concerns regarding arms exports and the Kurdish–Turkish conflict. As part of the agreement, Finland and Sweden will support Turkey's participation in PESCO's Military Mobility project. Finland and Sweden also affirmed that the Kurdistan Workers' Party (PKK) is "a terrorist organization". On 29 June, NATO extended a formal invitation to Finland and Sweden to join the alliance. On 30 June, Turkish President Recep Tayyip Erdoğan said that Sweden had made a "promise" to extradite "73 terrorists" to Turkey. Swedish Prime Minister Andersson refused to deny Turkey's claim that Sweden had promised to deport political refugees and opponents wanted by Erdoğan's government.

Regional defense 
Ahead of the summit, the Bucharest Nine made a joint declaration on 10 June 2022, calling for forward defense in NATO's eastern flank. The summit may also see the alliance expand the NATO Response Force from 40,000 to "well over 300,000". Kaja Kallas, the prime minister of Estonia, hopes that NATO will increase its troop presence with a division of 20,000 to 25,000 soldiers in each of the Baltic states to defend the territory of each state against a potential Russian invasion. Meanwhile, Nausėda's looking to increase the Baltic contingent to the size of a brigade, much less than what Kallas called for. Under preexisting plans, only about a thousand foreign soldiers are present in each state. The Spanish government wants NATO to also consider regional security to the south, particularly concerning migration from Africa, Islamist groups in the Sahel, and Russian mercenaries operating in the region.

On 29 June, the second day of the summit, United States President Joe Biden announced that the US would establish a permanent military base in Poland that would serve as the headquarters of V Corps and provide two additional F-35 squadrons in the United Kingdom, another brigade in Romania, and air defense systems in Italy and Germany. The White House also reported a 50% increase (4 to 6) in the number of Arleigh Burke-class destroyers deployed in Naval Station Rota.

On 30 June, British Prime Minister, Boris Johnson, announced the United Kingdom's defence spending would increase from 2.3% of GDP in 2022 to 2.5% of GDP in 2030. The UK will also provide 1000 additional troops and a Queen Elizabeth-class aircraft carrier to NATO's Eastern flank.

Protests 
On 26 June 2022, several thousand people gathered in Madrid to protest against NATO, calling for the organization to be dissolved and the closure of US military bases in Spain. A protest scheduled to occur on the first day of the summit was banned by the Spanish government.

Participants

See also 
 48th G7 summit
 Government and intergovernmental reactions to the 2022 Russian invasion of Ukraine
 Second Cold War
 1997 NATO Madrid summit

References 

2022 conferences
2022 in Madrid
2022 in international relations
21st-century diplomatic conferences (NATO)
Spain and NATO
Diplomatic conferences in Spain
June 2022 events in Europe
NATO summits
June 2022 events in Spain